The Bulgaria–Turkey border is a  long international border between the Republic of Bulgaria and the Republic of Turkey. It was established by the Treaty of San Stefano in 1878 as an inner border within the Ottoman Empire between Adrianople Vilayet and the autonomous province of Eastern Rumelia. The current borders are defined by the Treaty of Constantinople (1913) and the Bulgarian–Ottoman convention (1915). The border was reaffirmed by the Treaty of Lausanne ten years later, though Bulgaria was not a party to the latter treaty as it had earlier ceded to Greece that part of its border with Turkey which was modified by the Bulgarian-Ottoman convention.

Border barrier

In response to the European migrant crisis, Bulgaria erected a border barrier to halt the influx of illegal crossings.

The Bulgarian Army completed the protective barrier in July 2014 at a cost of around €5 million. As a result of the new fence, illegal crossing attempts in the vicinity of the installation have decreased by seven times. Turkey's ambassador to Bulgaria Suleyman Gokce has expressed dissatisfaction with the border barrier adding that it creates discontent and gives reason to "reflect on the political message," that the fence is sending.

At the beginning of 2015, the government announced a  extension to the barbed wire border fence in order to completely secure the land border. Prime Minister Boyko Borisov described the extension as "absolutely necessary," in order to prevent persons from illegally entering the European Union member state. The Bulgarian Parliament has decided to continue construction of the fence at the border with Turkey without launching a public procurement procedure because of the need to safeguard national security. This final section of the fence completely seals off Bulgarian border with Turkey.
Since August 2022, three Bulgarian border guards were killed by migrants, trying to illegally to cross the border.

Crossings

There are three crossings along the entire border, two for vehicular traffic and one for vehicular and rail traffic. The busiest of three, Kapıkule, is among the busiest border checkpoints in the world.

References

 
European Union external borders
Border barriers constructed during the European migrant crisis
Borders of Bulgaria
Borders of Turkey
Thrace
International borders